The following radio stations broadcast on AM frequency 780 kHz: There are only eight stations in the 48 contiguous United States plus one in Alaska which are authorized to broadcast on 780 AM during nighttime hours. 780 AM is a United States clear-channel frequency. WBBM Chicago and KNOM Nome, Alaska, share Class A status of 780 kHz.

Argentina 
 LRA10 in Ushuaia, Tierra del Fuego
 LRA12 in Santo Tomé
 LRF210 Radio 3 in Trelew, Chubut
 LV8 Libertador in Mendoza

British Virgin Islands
ZBVI

Mexico 
 XEGLO-AM in Guelatao de Juárez, Oaxaca
 XELD-AM in Autlan de Navarro, Jalisco
 XESFT-AM in San Fernando, Tamaulipas
 XEWGR-AM in Monclova, Coahuila
 XEXY-AM in Ciudad Altamirano, Guerrero
 XEZN-AM in Celaya, Guanajuato

United States 
Stations in bold are clear-channel stations.

References

In fiction 
 KACL in Seattle, Washington - featured in the series Frasier

Lists of radio stations by frequency